Orthrosanthus is a genus of flowering plants in the family Iridaceae first described as a genus in 1827. It native to Australia, Mexico, Central and South America.

The genus name is derived from the Greek words orthros, meaning "morning", and anthos, meaning "flower". They are known commonly as morning irises.

Description
These are rhizomatous perennial herbs. The linear to sword-shaped leaves are arranged in a layered fan. The flowers are usually blue, except in one white-flowered species. This genus is closely related to the genus Libertia. The flowers are very similar, but Libertia flowers are usually white.

 Species
 Orthrosanthus acorifolius (Kunth) Ravenna - Colombia, Venezuela
 Orthrosanthus chimboracensis (Kunth) Baker - Chiapas, Costa Rica, Panama, Colombia, Venezuela, Ecuador, Peru, Bolivia, northwestern Brazil 
 Orthrosanthus exsertus (R.C.Foster) Ravenna - Mexico, Honduras
 Orthrosanthus laxus (Endl.) Benth. - Western Australia
 Orthrosanthus monadelphusRavenna - southern Mexico, Central America
 Orthrosanthus muelleri Benth. Benth. - Western Australia
 Orthrosanthus multiflorus Sweet - Western Australia, South Australia, Victoria
 Orthrosanthus occissapungus (Ruiz ex Klatt) Diels - Peru, Bolivia, northwestern Argentina
 Orthrosanthus polystachyus Benth. - many-spike orthrosanthus - Western Australia

References

External links
 

Sisyrinchieae
Iridaceae genera